This article lists the confirmed squads for the 2021 Men's EuroHockey Nations Championship tournament held in Amstelveen, Netherlands between 4 and 12 June 2021. The eight national teams were required to register a playing squad of 18 players and two reserves.

Age, caps and club for each player are as of 4 June 2021, the first day of the tournament.

Pool A

Belgium
Head coach:  Shane McLeod

Belgium announced their final squad on 25 May 2021.

England
Head coach: Danny Kerry

England announced their final squad on 28 May 2021.

Russia
Head coach: Vladimir Konkin

Russia's final squad.

Spain
Head coach:  Fred Soyez

Spain announced their final squad on 25 May 2021. On 28 May, Roc Oliva was replaced by Marc Miralles because of Oliva's imminent fatherhood.

Pool B

France
Head coach:  Jeroen Delmee

France announced their final squad on 30 May 2021.

Germany
Germany announced their final squad on 28 May 2021.

Head coach: Kais al Saadi

Netherlands
Head coach:  Maximiliano Caldas

The Netherlands announced their final squad on 28 May 2021.

Wales
Head coach: Daniel Newcombe

Wales announced a 20-player squad on 21 May 2021. Their final squad was announced on 4 June 2021.

References

Squads
EuroHockey Nations Championship squads